The Dutch Eerste Divisie in the 1969–70 season was contested by 18 teams. FC Volendam won the championship.

New entrants
Promoted from the 1968–69 Tweede Divisie:
 SBV Excelsior
 Fortuna Vlaardingen
 De Graafschap
Relegated from the 1968–69 Eredivisie:
 Fortuna SC
 FC Volendam

League standings

See also
 1969–70 Eredivisie
 1969–70 Tweede Divisie

References
Netherlands - List of final tables (RSSSF)

Eerste Divisie seasons
2
Neth